Pradmyestse literally means "suburb" in Belarusian language. It may also refer to the following places in Belarus:

Aranskaye radmyestse (Arany) in Minsk
Basiyalawskaye radmyestse (Vyesyalowka) in Minsk
Kalvariyskaye pradmyestse in Minsk
Rakawskaye pradmyestse in Minsk
Pyatnitskaye pradmyestse in Minsk
Tatarskaye pradmiescie (Tatarskaya Slabada) in Minsk
Kamarowskaye pradmyestse (Kamarowka) in Minsk
Lyachawskaye pradmyestse (Lyachawka) in Minsk
Starazhowskaye pradmyestse (Starazhowka) in Minsk
Hrushawskaye pradmyestse (Hrushawka) in Minsk
Trayetskaye pradmyestse in Minsk
Zanyomanskaye pradmyestse in Grodno
Valynskaye pradmyestse (Zamuchaviečča) in Brest
Chacherskaye pradmyestse in Gomel
Karabanawskaye pradmyestse (Karabanawka) in Mogilev
Bychawskaye pradmyestse in Mogilev
Vilyenskaye pradmyestse in Mogilev